Gretna Commercial Historic District is a national historic district located at Gretna, Pittsylvania County, Virginia. The district encompasses 26 contributing buildings in the central business district of Gretna. The district primarily developed in the early-to-mid-20th century, with buildings dated between about 1881 and 1963.  Notable buildings include the Thomas C. and Robert H. Creasy storehouse (1881), Masonic hall (1902), Bank of Elba (1907), Dalton building (c. 1914), W.D. Love and Co. grocery store (c. 1921), Amoco Service Station (1940), former Gretna Fire Station and Town Hall, and Berger Motor Co. (mid-1940s).

It was listed on the National Register of Historic Places in 2013.

References

Commercial buildings on the National Register of Historic Places in Virginia
Historic districts on the National Register of Historic Places in Virginia
Buildings and structures in Pittsylvania County, Virginia
National Register of Historic Places in Pittsylvania County, Virginia